Frank Aasand (July 27, 1949 – January 15, 2019) was an American curler, a  and a 1972 United States men's curling champion.

That 1972 silver medallist team is best known for the "Curse of LaBonte" - one of the most famous curses in curling history. It was caused by an incident at the finals of the 1972 world men's curling championship, the 1972 Air Canada Silver Broom in Garmisch-Partenkirchen, Germany.

He also won the 1976 United States Mixed Curling Championship.

Personal life
Aasand was the son of Ole Aasand and Frances Weed, and his brother John was his teammate. He graduated from Grafton High School and North Dakota State University with a degree in pharmacy and worked for Getz Drug. He was married to Victoria LaBonte and lived in Grafton and had three children. He later owned Frank's Pharmacy, and then worked for Grafton Drug. He moved to Fargo in 2011. He was a member of the St. John the Evangelist Catholic Church, the Elks Club, the Eagle's Club and was a past president of the Grafton Curling Club. In 2012, Aasand pleaded guilty to aggravated assault, and initially faced an attempted murder charge. He was accused of repeatedly hitting his wife on the head with a hammer. After spending time in jail, he agreed to move away from Grafton and was barred from contacting his wife.

Teams

Men's

Mixed

References

External links
 

1949 births
2019 deaths
American male curlers
American curling champions
Sportspeople from Fargo, North Dakota
People from Walsh County, North Dakota
American people convicted of assault
North Dakota State University alumni
American Catholics
Pharmacists from North Dakota
Prisoners and detainees of North Dakota